The men's freestyle light heavyweight competition at the 1932 Summer Olympics in Los Angeles took place from 1 August to 3 August at the Grand Olympic Auditorium. Nations were limited to one competitor. This weight class was limited to wrestlers weighing up to 87kg.

This freestyle wrestling competition did not use the single-elimination bracket format previously used for Olympic freestyle wrestling but instead followed the format that was introduced at the 1928 Summer Olympics for Greco-Roman wrestling, using an elimination system based on the accumulation of points. Each round featured all wrestlers pairing off and wrestling one bout (with one wrestler having a bye if there were an odd number). The loser received 3 points. The winner received 1 point if the win was by decision and 0 points if the win was by fall. At the end of each round, any wrestler with at least 5 points was eliminated.

Schedule

Results

Round 1

Both bouts were won by fall, with Mehringer and Scarf the victors (0 points) and Sjöstedt and Madison the losers (3 points).

 Bouts

 Points

Round 2

The first-round winners drew the opposite first-round loser for the second round, with mixed results. Mehringer prevailed a second time (this time by decision, earning 1 point), giving Madison his second loss and elimination. Scarf, however, fell to Sjöstedt by fall, with both wrestlers ending the round at 3 points.

 Points

Final round

Sjöstedt had already faced each of Mehringer and Scarf, so the only possible bout left among the three wrestlers was between Mehringer and Scarf. Scarf could not have taken gold, but only silver with a win (a win by fall would have left him tied at 3 points with Sjöstedt, whom he had already lost to; a win by decision would leave him tied with Mehringer at second but also broken that tie in favor of Scarf) or bronze with a loss. Sjöstedt was guaranteed at least silver with the bye, hoping for a Scarf win to give Sjöstedt gold. Mehringer could have finished the round with either gold (any win) or bronze (a loss). Mehringer won by decision, earning gold and sending Scarf to the bronze medal position, while Sjöstedt took silver.

 Points

References

Wrestling at the 1932 Summer Olympics